During the 1991–92 English football season, Queens Park Rangers F.C. competed in the Football League First Division.

Season summary
In the 1991–92 First Division campaign, QPR finished 11th in the league and ensured their place as founder members of the new Premier League, which began the following season. Their manager Gerry Francis oversaw one of QPR's most famous victories, the 4–1 win over leaders Manchester United at Old Trafford broadcast live on terrestrial television on New Year's Day 1992. The hat-trick scored by Dennis Bailey in that game was the last time the feat was achieved by an away player in league football at Old Trafford until 2021.

Final league table

Results
QPR's score comes first

Legend

Football League First Division

FA Cup

League Cup

Full Members Cup

Squad

Transfers

In

Out

Transfers in:  £1,280,000
Transfers out:  £2,100,000
Total spending:  £820,000

References

Queens Park Rangers F.C. seasons
Queens Park Rangers